Richard Kevin Hunt (November 29, 1948 – May 22, 2015) was a professional American football player who played offensive lineman for seven seasons for the Green Bay Packers, New England Patriots, Houston Oilers, and New Orleans Saints.

References

1948 births
2015 deaths
American football offensive linemen
Doane Tigers football players
Green Bay Packers players
New England Patriots players
Houston Oilers players
New Orleans Saints players